Free Kamal is a collaborative studio album by Radioinactive and Antimc. It was released on Mush Records in 2004. It debuted at number 35 on CMJ's Hip Hop chart.

Critical reception
Brian Howe of Pitchfork gave the album a 7.7 out of 10, saying, "while its themes are often serious, Free Kamal is giddy and upbeat, a bright ray of SoCal summer." Meanwhile, Justin Cober-Lake of PopMatters said, "They usually match clever lyrics to interesting beats, and their missteps are a somewhat natural part of taking creative chances."

Track listing

References

External links
 

2004 albums
Radioinactive albums
Mush Records albums
Collaborative albums